Omdurman Islamic University (OIU) is built on an area of size about 800 feddans (3,360,000 square meters) in Omdurman, Sudan. While the school is primarily oriented toward Islamic studies, it serves other fields of studies as well, such as engineering, agriculture and medicine. Omdurman Islamic University is a member of the Federation of the Universities of the Islamic World.

History
Omdurman Islamic University use to be called Omdurman Scientific Institute. The Omdurman Scientific Institute is the first private scientific institute established in modern Sudan, and many prominent Sudanese scholars and personalities have graduated from it. 
Sudanese scholars asked the colonial government at the time to establish the Omdurman Scientific Institute, and it agreed and established the institute in 1912, as a response to foreign education. The institute represents the beginning of regular religious education in Sudan, which adopted the Al-Azhar system. The scientific institute developed in the mid-sixties of the twentieth century to later become Omdurman Islamic University in 1965.

Faculties 
Faculty of Medicine and Health Sciences
Faculty of Sciences and Technology
Faculty of Engineering Sciences
Faculty of Agriculture
Faculty of Pharmacy
Faculty of Sharia and Law
Faculty of Medical Laboratories Sciences
Faculty of Economics
Faculty of Media
Faculty of Education
Faculty of Computer and Information Technology

References

 
Universities and colleges in Sudan
Medical schools in Sudan
Islamic universities and colleges
Omdurman